Hibernians Basketball Club, also known as Hibs, is a sports club located in Paola, Malta. 
The team competes in Malta's Division One Basketball league.

Notable players
- Set a club record or won an individual award as a professional player.
- Played at least one official international match for his senior national team at any time.
  Marko Matijevic
  Cuschieri Patus
  Roderick Vella
  Ivan Demcesen

See also
 Hibernians F.C.

References

External links
Presentation at league website

Basketball teams established in 1984
Basketball teams in Malta
Paola, Malta